The Maxwell Park School, in Chaffee County, Colorado near Buena Vista, Colorado was completed in 1889.  It was listed on the National Register of Historic Places in 2020.

According to nearby ranch owner Suze Kelly,The school building was built of handmade cement blocks and you can see the hand and fingerprints in the blocks. The Centerville school, now gone, was also built of these blocks. The blocks are from 18-23 inches long and hollow; the cement is rough and full of rocks. The kitchen addition on the Kelly ranch house is also built of these same blocks. There are fish scale shingles on gables at the peak at front and back of the school. ... There is a bell tower (minus the bell) on the front of the roof. ...Behind the school building was a barn for the kids to keep their horses in while they were in school for the day.

It operated as a school from 1889 to 1933, during which time there were 25 female teachers and one male teacher. The Nachtrieb ranch became the Kelly ranch in 1951, and was listed on the National Register as Nachtrieb-Kelly Ranch in 2017.

References

Schools in Chaffee County, Colorado
One-room schoolhouses in Colorado
National Register of Historic Places in Chaffee County, Colorado
School buildings completed in 1889
School buildings on the National Register of Historic Places in Colorado